Blood Machine (2001) is the second collaborative album by American ambient musicians Steve Roach and Vir Unis, released in 2001.

Reception 
AllMusic rated the album a 3 of 5, stating "Blood Machine is quite a departure from both Roach's and Vir Unis' work of late, but undoubtedly this is one of the freshest recordings of 2001."

Track listing

Personnel 
Adapted from Discogs.
 Sam Rosenthal – layout
 Roger King – mastering
 Steve Roach – mixing, performer, mastering, artwork
 Vir Unis – performer, cover images

References

External links 
 Blood Machine at Discogs
 Blood Machine at Projekt Records

2001 albums
Steve Roach (musician) albums
Green House Music albums